Tony Bentley-Buckle (13 August 1921 – 24 May 2010) was a Kenyan sailor. He competed in the Flying Dutchman event at the 1960 Summer Olympics.

References

External links
 

1921 births
2010 deaths
Kenyan male sailors (sport)
Olympic sailors of Kenya
Sailors at the 1960 Summer Olympics – Flying Dutchman
Sportspeople from West Flanders